Thermofluids is a branch of science and engineering encompassing four intersecting fields:
Heat transfer
Thermodynamics
Fluid mechanics
Combustion

The term is a combination of "thermo", referring to heat, and "fluids", which refers to liquids, gases and vapors. Temperature, pressure, equations of state, and transport laws all play an important role in thermofluid problems.  Phase transition and chemical reactions may also be important in a thermofluid context.  The subject is sometimes also referred to as "thermal fluids".

Heat transfer
Heat transfer is a discipline of thermal engineering that concerns the transfer of thermal energy from one physical system to another. Heat transfer is classified into various mechanisms, such as heat conduction, convection, thermal radiation, and phase-change transfer. Engineers also consider the transfer of mass of differing chemical species, either cold or hot, to achieve heat transfer.  

Sections include :
Energy transfer by heat, work and mass
Laws of thermodynamics
Entropy
Refrigeration Techniques
Properties and nature of pure substances

Applications
Engineering : Predicting and analysing the performance of machines

Thermodynamics
Thermodynamics is the science of energy conversion involving heat and other forms of energy, most notably mechanical work. It studies and interrelates the macroscopic variables, such as temperature, volume and pressure, which describe physical, thermodynamic systems.

Fluid mechanics
Fluid Mechanics the study of the physical forces at work during fluid flow. Fluid mechanics can be divided into fluid kinematics, the study of fluid motion, and fluid kinetics, the study of the effect of forces on fluid motion. Fluid mechanics can further be divided into fluid statics, the study of fluids at rest, and fluid dynamics, the study of fluids in motion. Some of its more interesting concepts include momentum and reactive forces in fluid flow and fluid machinery theory and performance.

Sections include:
Fluid flow and continuity
Momentum in fluids
Static and dynamic forces on a boundary
Laminar and turbulent flow
Metacentric height and vessel stability

Applications
Pump Design.
Hydro-Electric Power Generation.
Naval Architecture.

Combustion
Combustion is the sequence of exothermic chemical reactions between a fuel and an oxidant accompanied by the production of heat and conversion of chemical species. The release of heat can result in the production of light  in the form of either glowing or a flame. Fuels of interest often include organic compounds (especially hydrocarbons) in the gas, liquid or solid phase.

References

External links
 Thermal-Fluids Central

Continuum mechanics
Branches of thermodynamics